Anna Gonsalves Paes de Azevedo (Salvador de Bahia, Brazil; 1612—The Hague, Netherlands; 21 December 1674), or Anna Paes, was a Brazilian plantation owner. 

Daughter of the Portuguese plantation owner Jeronimo de Azevedo and Isabel Gonsalves Paes; married in 1630 to Portuguese army Captain Pedro Correia da Silva (d. 1630), and 1637 in Recife to Charles de Tourlon (d. 1644), commander of the guard of the Dutch governor John Maurice, Prince of Nassau-Siegen, and in 1645 in Recife to Gijsbert de With (1611–1692), councillor in the Dutch colonial legal court of Brazil.

Anna Paes was given one of the largest sugar plantations in Brazil as a dowry upon her first marriage in 1630. In contrast to most Portuguese colonists, she remained when Portuguese Brazil became conquered by the Dutch and became an important member at the court of the Dutch governor John Maurice, Prince of Nassau-Siegen, with whom she was said to have had an affair. During the war with the Portuguese, she declared loyalty toward the Netherlands, and left for The Hague when Brazil was taken by Portugal in 1654.  
 
In Brazil, "Dona Anna Paes" became a legendary figure, often used in literature. She is the subject of a novel by Luzilá Gonçalves Ferreira.

References 
 http://www.inghist.nl/Onderzoek/Projecten/DVN/lemmata/data/Paes
 Michiel van Groesen, Gonsalves Paes de Azevedo, Anna, in: Digitaal Vrouwenlexicon van Nederland. URL: http://resources.huygens.knaw.nl/vrouwenlexicon/lemmata/data/Paes [13/01/2014] 

17th-century Brazilian businesswomen
1612 births
1674 deaths
17th-century women landowners